Amas Musical Theatre, also known as the Rosetta LeNoire Theatre Academy and the Mainstage Musical Theatre, and formerly known as the Amas Repertory Theatre, Inc. and the Eubie Blake Youth Theatre, is a non-profit Manhattan-based theatre organization founded by Rosetta LeNoire. The name stems from the Latin word "amare", meaning "to love". "Amas" is the active indicative present form of "you love". The Academy puts on both a showcase and an off-off-Broadway performance at the end of the year, featuring inner-city and other teenagers. Amas is an anchor theatre tenant of The Players Theatre, a theatre located in Greenwich Village. The theatre has produced over 60 original musicals, including Bubbling Brown Sugar and Bojangles!.

History
The organization was founded in 1968 by Rosetta LeNoire as the Amas Repertory Theatre to promote interracial and color-blind casting. In her words, it was a place "where all people could work together, with respect for individual skills and talents, rather than for race or color." In 1997, a newspaper called the New York Beacon wrote that "Rosetta created non-traditional casting before the phrase itself was created." Amas' first production, Soul, Yesterday and Today, which was based on the poetry of Langston Hughes, held its rehearsals in the basement of LeNoire's home in the Bronx. In 1989, the name was changed to Amas Musical Theatre. In 1977, Amas moved to Fifth Avenue and 104th Street, then in 1992 to the West 42nd Street theatre district.
The organization's youth program, now known as the Amas Musical Theatre Teen Academy, was known as the Eubie Blake Youth Theatre from the 1970s to 1980s, where training was offered to youths ages 10 to 18.

Production history

Theatre programs
In the past 10 years, Amas has worked with over 60 creative teams in the development of new musicals.

Six O'Clock Musical Theatre Lab
This is a development program for writers, lyricists, and composers to mount staged readings of new musicals. Each work generally receives three or four performances.

Workshop Program
This is a program which lets composers, lyricists, and librettists work on a more polished and complete version of a new work. The productions generally entail a two to three-week rehearsal period with a series of performances.

Mainstage Program
This is a program which gives select musicals a fully produced off-Broadway run for four to six weeks with attendance by critics. The productions generally run under an Equity Letter of Agreement contract.

Educational programs

Rosetta LeNoire Musical Theatre Academy
This is a performance and training program which enrolls up to 30 teenagers and young adults between the ages of 14 to 21 in all-day classes and rehearsals on Saturdays and some Sundays from October through May. 60% of students receive full or partial Scholarships. The program ends with a musical which runs for two weeks in an off-off-Broadway theatre.

Immigration Experience
This is an in-residence set of workshops for middle and high school students consisting of 32 visits specializing in playwriting, theatre, and musical composition. Students also research their families' and communities' immigration histories which are turned into writings and songs performed in front of their school and extended community.

Broadway Babies
This is an in-residence program which runs from 4 to 12 weeks for younger children. Students make a mini-version of a Broadway show which relates to themes or curriculum being studied in their class.

Our America: The Civil Rights Movement through Song and Story
This is an in-residence program which explores the Civil Rights Movement, Dr. Martin Luther King Jr., and Protest and Peace Songs, among other things. Eventually, there is a presentation.

Passport Around the World
This is an in-residence program with 18 artist visits based on the social studies curriculum of the classroom. Students create their own US Passport which includes a picture and stamped with flags which they will "visit"/study. The program concludes with a final presentation of the pieces studied.

Urban Mythography: Journey of the Hero
This is a program for elementary and middle school students to study Native American, Asian, classical Western and European mythologies and heroic icons. The class creates a piece to be rehearsed and presented to their school.

Awards
 Mayor's Award of Honor for Art and Culture
 Manhattan Borough's President Award – Excellence in Theatre
 Audience Development Committee (AUDELCO) Award – 1979, 1982, 1984, 1986
 National Medal of Arts (given to LeNoire) – 1999

References

Youth theatre companies